The Nala Local Municipality council consists of twenty-four members elected by mixed-member proportional representation. Twelve councillors are elected by first-past-the-post voting in twelve wards, while the remaining twelve are chosen from party lists so that the total number of party representatives is proportional to the number of votes received.

In the election of 3 August 2016 the African National Congress (ANC) won a majority of fifteen seats on the council.

In the election of 1 November 2021, the ANC lost its majority, winning twelve of the available twenty-four seats.

Results 
The following table shows the composition of the council after past elections.

December 2000 election

The following table shows the results of the 2000 election.

March 2006 election

The following table shows the results of the 2006 election.

May 2011 election

The following table shows the results of the 2011 election.

August 2016 election

The following table shows the results of the 2016 election.

By-elections from August 2016 to November 2021

In a by-election held on 5 September 2018, a ward previously held by an ANC councillor was won by the DA candidate. Council composition was reconfigured as seen below:

November 2021 election

The following table shows the results of the 2021 election.

References

Nala
Elections in the Free State
Lejweleputswa District Municipality